Christian Democratic Youth (Kristendemokratisk Ungdom), formerly Kristelig Folkepartis Ungdom (Youth of Christian People's Party), is the youth league of  Christian Democrats (Denmark).

External links 
KDU website

Christian democratic parties in Europe
Youth wings of conservative parties
Youth wings of political parties in Denmark